Charlie Countryman (originally titled The Necessary Death of Charlie Countryman as well as Kill Charlie Countryman) is a 2013 romantic drama film directed by Fredrik Bond in his directorial debut, written by Matt Drake, and starring Shia LaBeouf, Evan Rachel Wood and Mads Mikkelsen.

The film premiered on January 21, 2013 at the 2013 Sundance Film Festival and was screened in competition at the 63rd Berlin International Film Festival. The film was released November 15, 2013 in the United States was released on October 31, 2014 in the United Kingdom.

Plot
In Chicago, Charlie Countryman grieves as his dying mother is taken off life support. Her spirit appears to him, urging him to go to Bucharest, and Charlie does so. He bonds with Victor, the Romanian man sitting next to him on the plane, who is returning home after seeing a Chicago Cubs game. During the flight, Victor dies, and his spirit asks Charlie to deliver a gift and a final message to his daughter.

At the airport, Charlie is tased and questioned by security after trying to retrieve Victor’s gift. He is instantly smitten with Victor's daughter, Gabi, and consoles her before parting ways. Taking a taxi into the city, he notices Gabi in her car and offers to drive her. They nearly collide with the ambulance transporting her father’s body, which crashes. Gabi accompanies the body in another ambulance, leaving her car with Charlie, who finds a revolver in her purse with an inscription from “Nigel”.

He drives to the Romanian Athenaeum where Gabi performs as a cellist, and she calls him with instructions to deliver her instrument to the conductor, Bela. Charlie waits while Gabi performs with the pit orchestra, and they are confronted by her estranged husband, Nigel. Staying at a hostel, Charlie parties with his roommates Karl and Luc after they dose him with ecstasy, and is menaced by Nigel in the bathroom. Spotting Gabi, Charlie insists on following her and they spend the night out, sharing memories of their parents, and she promises him a kiss if he can find her the next day.

After Karl takes an overdose of Viagra, he and Luc bring Charlie to a strip club. They receive a bill for 9,900 Romanian leu ($) and are threatened by the manager, Darko, who notices that Charlie recognizes pictures of Nigel and Gabi on his wall. Demanding to know Nigel’s whereabouts, Darko lets them go. Charlie waits for Gabi at the Athenaeum, and Bela takes him to Gabi’s home, where a memorial is being held for Victor. Gabi and Charlie share the kiss she promised him, and he tells her about meeting Darko. Nigel barges in and threatens Charlie, but Gabi forces him to leave at gunpoint. Once they are alone, she explains to Charlie how she met Nigel, realizing he was a violent criminal after they married, and that her father forced Nigel to leave Bucharest with the threat of an incriminating videotape that Darko wants to obtain. Charlie confesses he is in love with her, and they have sex.

Waking up alone, Charlie finds a tape in Victor’s collection labeled “Cubs Win World Series - 1995”, revealed to be security footage of Nigel and Darko murdering a group of people. A shocked Charlie finds Gabi at a café with Nigel and declares to them that he watched the tape. Nigel nearly kills him before the police arrive, escaping while Charlie is taken into custody. Bela arranges to have Charlie sent to Budapest, bluntly stating that Gabi doesn't want to see him. Charlie is dropped off at the hostel to collect his belongings, but the owner warns him that men are waiting for him. Pursued by Darko’s henchmen, Charlie escapes to Gabi’s house only to find the tape missing. He is confronted by Darko, who has kidnapped and interrogated Karl and Luc. Gabi calls Darko to arrange a meeting, and he knocks Charlie unconscious.

Gabi finds Charlie outside the Athenaeum and tells him that he will never see her again. Having taken the tape, she prepares to leave with Nigel to meet Darko. Encouraged by another vision of his mother, Charlie tries to stop Nigel but is knocked out again. He is taken to the docks and hung by his ankle above the water, while Darko burns the tape. Nigel forces Gabi to shoot Charlie, but she spares him as the police arrive. Darko and his men flee, dropping Charlie into the water, while Nigel realizes Gabi loves Charlie and commits suicide by cop. Charlie emerges from the water alive and reunites with Gabi.

Cast
Shia LaBeouf as Charlie Countryman
Evan Rachel Wood as Gabriella "Gabi" Ibanescu
Mads Mikkelsen as Nigel
Til Schweiger as Darko
Rupert Grint as Karl
James Buckley as Luc
Ion Caramitru as Victor Ibanescu
Vincent D'Onofrio as Bill
Melissa Leo as Kate Countryman
Andrei Finti as Bela
Gabriel Spahiu as Taxi Driver
Aubrey Plaza as Ashley
Vanessa Kirby as Felicity
Lia Sinchevici as Waitress
Ian Fisher

John Hurt was a brief narrator for the film's original version released at Sundance, but his narration was edited out and is included on its Blu-ray release as an extra.

Production
In early development, LaBeouf dropped out of the project and the title role was briefly given to Zac Efron before LaBeouf returned to the project in August 2010. Dante Ariola was originally attached as director but left before filming began.

Filming took place between May and June 2012 and filmed on location in Romania.

LaBeouf reportedly tripped on acid while filming acid scenes. According to LaBeouf, he had to trip on the acid to really get into the head of his character and to emulate some of his acting heroes. "There's a way to do an acid trip like Harold & Kumar and there's a way to be on acid. What I know of acting, Sean Penn actually strapped up to that electric chair in Dead Man Walking. These are the guys that I look up to."

Release
Wood criticised the American censors for insisting that a scene be cut in which her character receives oral sex from LaBeouf, while taking no issue with the many violent scenes:

Music
The official soundtrack album was released digitally on Feb 11, 2014, by Psychedelic Records. The soundtrack album featured 14 songs of score music composed by Christophe Beck and Deadmono.

Reception
Charlie Countryman received negative reviews from critics. Review aggregator website Rotten Tomatoes reports a 27% approval rating, based on 66 reviews with an average rating of 3.93/10; the site's consensus reads: "Shia LaBeouf clearly relishes his role in Charlie Countryman, but his efforts can't salvage the movie's shallow script and overstuffed direction." Metacritic, which assigns a normalized score, rated it 31/100 based on 20 reviews.

John Anderson of Variety called it "a profoundly unnecessary film" with "strained attempts at magic realism". Justin Lowe of The Hollywood Reporter describe it as "an atmospheric feature that sets out to tackle big questions of love and destiny."  Stephen Holden of The New York Times wrote, "this catastrophe of a movie zigzags drunkenly between action-adventure and surreal comedy with some magical realism slopped over it like ketchup."  Robert Abele of the Los Angeles Times wrote, "Pulpy dross of surpassing dumbness, Charlie Countryman takes the blender approach to mixing dark adventure, doofus comedy and pie-eyed romance, but forgets to put the lid on when pulsed."  Damon Wise of Empire gave a positive review, stating "Bond's use of music is excellent and his vision of eastern Europe both hellish and magical."

References

External links

2013 films
2013 romantic comedy-drama films
2010s romantic thriller films
American romantic comedy-drama films
American comedy thriller films
American romantic comedy films
Romanian comedy-drama films
Romanian comedy thriller films
English-language Romanian films
2010s Romanian-language films
Films scored by Christophe Beck
Films set in Bucharest
Films shot in Bucharest
Films shot in Chicago
Films shot in Romania
American independent films
Magic realism films
Romanian independent films
2013 directorial debut films
2013 comedy films
2013 drama films
2010s English-language films
2013 multilingual films
American multilingual films
Romanian multilingual films
2010s American films